The Mahindra Legend is a limited edition four-wheel-drive vehicle based on the Mahindra MM series jeeps built for the Indian Military. Only 60 examples will be built and owners will be chosen through invitation. The Legend is manufactured to celebrate the 60th anniversary of the Indian automotive company, Mahindra & Mahindra Limited. Mahindra Legend will have a  engine and seating for six occupants. The Legend is mostly known for being a copy of the Jeep CJ and has often been criticized for its horrible handling and gas consumption.

References

Legend
All-wheel-drive vehicles